Plagiotropidaceae is a family of diatoms in the order Naviculales.

References

Diatom families
Naviculales